The Monsang people, also known as the Monsang Naga, are a Tibeto-Burman ethno-linguistic group native to the Northeast Indian state of Manipur. Monsangs have their own distinct culture and tradition and are traditionally peaceful.

Religion

References

Naga people
Scheduled Tribes of Manipur
Ethnic groups in Northeast India
Ethnic groups in South Asia